The German Taxpayers Federation is an association established in 1949 by Karl Bräuer. Its main aims are the reduction of taxation and public spending, as well as the reduction of bureaucracy and public debt.

References

External links
Website des Bundes der Steuerzahler

Conservatism in Germany
Taxation in Germany
Taxpayer groups
Think tanks based in Germany
Organizations established in 1949
1949 establishments in Germany
Liberalism in Germany